The lesser greenlet (Pachysylvia decurtata) is a small passerine bird in the vireo family. It breeds from northeastern Mexico south to western Ecuador.

This is a common species of lowlands and foothills up to  altitude, where it inhabits forest canopy and edges, and the crowns of trees in tall second growth or semi-open areas. The normal clutch is two brown-marked white eggs.

It has olive-green upperparts and a pale grey head with a white eye ring. The underparts are white with a yellow tinge to the breast and some olive on the flanks. Young birds are duller and brown above, and have a buff tone to the sides of the head and the breast.

There are two races. Nominate H. d. decurtatus which breeds from central Panama southwards has a green crown to the head, and grey-crowned H. d. minor occupies the northern part of the bird's range. The latter subspecies was formerly given species status as the Grey-crowned Greenlet (H. minor) but the two forms interbreed extensively in central Panama and are now considered to be conspecific.

Lesser greenlets feed on spiders and insects gleaned from tree foliage, They also eat small fruits and seeds. They will join mixed-species feeding flocks, and often accompany gnatcatchers, warblers and honeycreepers.

The lesser greenlet has a nasal  call and the song is a whistled , slower and more melodious than that of the yellow-green vireo.

References

Further reading

External links

 
 
 
 

lesser greenlet
Birds of Central America
Birds of the Tumbes-Chocó-Magdalena
lesser greenlet
lesser greenlet